The Denmark women's national under-20 basketball team is a national basketball team of Denmark, administered by the Danish Basketball Association. It represents the country in women's international under-20 basketball competitions.

FIBA U20 Women's European Championship participations

See also
Denmark women's national basketball team
Denmark women's national under-18 basketball team
Denmark men's national under-20 basketball team

References

External links
Archived records of Denmark team participations

Basketball in Denmark
Basketball
Women's national under-20 basketball teams